The Impact X Cup Tournament consists of various types of X Division tournaments that feature wrestlers and/or teams from all over the world competing in Impact Wrestling – formerly Total Nonstop Action Wrestling (TNA) and Global Force Wrestling (GFW) – to fight for various trophies or championship matches. After a near decade long hiatus, the tournament returned in 2017 before going on another four-year hiatus. As of 2021, there has been  eight X cup tournaments (four super X cups and four team X cups). 

The first X Cup Tournament of any kind was the 2003 Super X Cup. It featured wrestlers from around the Globe competing in one-on-one matches. Chris Sabin was the winner of the 2003 Super X Cup. Since then, the generally positive response from TNA's viewers to the 2003 Super X Cup has led to other X Cup Tournaments. Multiple competitors in each tournament have represented various different companies, such as Pro Wrestling Noah, Lucha Libre AAA Worldwide, All Japan Pro Wrestling, AAW Wrestling, Border City Wrestling and Wrestle Circus. Throughout the history of the tournament, Impact has used a plethora of outside talent to compete in the tournament. In the early beginnings of the Super X Cup, it was stated that if you won the tournament you automatically became the number-one contender for the Impact X Division Championship.

Inaugural winner Chris Sabin holds the record most X cup wins with 3 (1 individually and 2 with Team USA). Team Mexico and Team USA are tied for most X cup wins as a team with 2 each. In individual X cups, no winners has won more than once as of January 2021.

Dates, venues and winners

Tournament history

2003

The inaugural Super X Cup tournament was hosted by Total Nonstop Action Wrestling. The event took place across two nights on August 20, 2003, and August 27, 2003, at the TNA Aslyum in Nashville, Tennessee.

2004

The first World X Cup was promoted by NWA: Total Nonstop Action and was held on May 26, 2004, at the TNA Aslyum in Nashville, Tennessee. This was the first group X Cup to be held in company history.

2005

The second Super X Cup was once again hosted by TNA taking place across four nights July 22, July 29, August 5, and August 14, 2005, at the TNA Impact! Zone in Orlando, Florida.
Tournament bracket

2006

The second World X Cup was promoted by Total Nonstop Action Wrestling and was held across four nights on April 27, May 4, May 11, May 14, 2006, at the TNA Impact! Zone. This was the second group X Cup to be held in company history.

2008

The third World X Cup was promoted by Total Nonstop Action Wrestling and was held across five nights. The first few rounds were held on June 19, June 26, July 3, and July 10, 2008, at the TNA Impact! Zone. The finals were held on July 13, 2008, at Reliant Arena in Houston, Texas. This was the third group X Cup to be held in company history and the first time that non TNA contracted wrestlers won the tournament.

2017

The third Super X Cup tournament was a three-night event hosted by Global Force Wrestling. The first round was held on July 16, 2017, while the second round was held on July 23 at the GFW Impact! Zone in Orlando, Florida. The final round was held on August 17, 2017.

2021

The fourth Super X Cup was promoted by Impact Wrestling and was held on January 9, 2021, at Skyway Studios in Nashville, Tennessee.

See also
Impact Wrestling
List of Total Nonstop Action Wrestling tournaments
Professional wrestling tournament
X Division

Impact Wrestling tournaments